The Monte Generoso Observatory used to be located atop Monte Generoso in the canton of Ticino, Switzerland. As of season 2021 it has been moved to the Park im Grünen in Bern, also supported by the Migros Culture Percentage.

Astronomical observatories in Switzerland
Buildings and structures in Ticino

de:Monte Generoso#Observatorium